Renegades, known as American Renegades in the United States, is a Franco-German action thriller film directed by Steven Quale and written by Luc Besson and Richard Wenk. The film stars Sullivan Stapleton, J. K. Simmons and Charlie Bewley, and follows a team of Navy SEALs who are asked to salvage Nazi gold stored in a bank vault in a submerged town at the bottom of a Bosnian lake. It was released on 1 September 2017 in Germany and 29 August 2018 in France and in the United States on January 22, 2019 on Blu-ray and DVD by Lionsgate Home Entertainment.

Plot
In August 1944, German forces decide to move captured paintings and about 25 tons of gold ingots from Paris to a safe location. The gold is then transported to the small Bosnian town of Bosansko Grahovo where it is put into the bank vault. German forces arrest all townspeople, while a little boy escapes.

In 1995 Sarajevo a team of U.S. Navy SEALs disguised as journalists capture and extract Serb general Milić who is responsible for numerous atrocities. However, their covert operation is compromised and the team is forced to escape the pursuing Serbs in a tank, causing extensive damage through the city. Back in the base, the team is reprimanded for their actions and put on a three-day leave. A member of the team, Stanton Baker, has a romance with a local waitress Lara and goes to her place. Soon after that, some thugs led by Lara's brother Milenko enter and demand something from her. Luckily, team leader Matt Barnes arrives to fight off the thugs and Lara then decides to reveal that the thugs were after the gold ingot she is keeping, worth about $150,000.

She explains that her grandfather was the only one who survived the massacre of civilians in Grahovo, stole a gold ingot and buried it before he was found by the Partisans who blew up the dam and flooded the town as the revenge for the German massacre. She reveals that there were at least 2,000 gold ingots, worth at least $300 million which would greatly benefit the local people in a war-torn country.

The team decides to retrieve the gold from the vault, now well below the water. By using their connection inside the base, they get the necessary equipment and transport it to the lake which lies deep in the enemy territory. Meanwhile, the thugs, led by Lara's brother, search her flat, find the gold, and show it to the local commander of the Serbian forces who decides to stop the SEAL team. The SEAL team establishes the air pocket inside a church and manages to break into the vault only to discover that it contains only ten gold ingots instead of 2,000 as stated by Lara. However, they find a covered opening in a wall where the rest of the gold is hidden. They then transport the gold to the surface by using an air-filled cargo parachute. The helicopter arrives just in time to fend off the enemy forces and the gold is then safely flown into the base. Half of the gold is then returned to France while the other half is sold and money distributed to the team, with Lara receiving majority of the sum. However, the team members decide to give their shares to Lara and then head to the bar.

Cast
 Sullivan Stapleton as Matt Barnes
 J. K. Simmons as Rear Admiral J. Levin
 Charlie Bewley as Stanton Baker
 Clemens Schick as Petrović
 Diarmaid Murtagh as Kurt Duffy
  as Boris
 Sylvia Hoeks as Lara Simić
 Joshua Henry as Ben Moran
 Dimitri Leonidas as Jack Porter
 Ewen Bremner as Jim Rainey
 Peter Davor as General Milić

Production
On September 30, 2014, it was announced that EuropaCorp had hired Steven Quale to direct the Navy SEALs action thriller The Lake from a screenplay written by Luc Besson and Richard Wenk. On March 2, 2015, Sullivan Stapleton was set to play the lead role. J. K. Simmons, Charlie Bewley and Diarmaid Murtagh were added to the cast of the film. Sylvia Hoeks, Joshua Henry and Dimitri Leonidas also joined the cast of the film.

Filming began on April 30, 2015.

The film received funds of €5 million, from the German Federal Film Fund (DFFF), as well as €275,000 from the Bavarian Film Fund (FFF Bayern).

Release
In March 2015, EuropaCorp set the film for a July 15, 2016, release. In February 2016, the film was pushed back to January 20, 2017. In May 2016, the film was pushed back to January 27, 2017, and again in early November 2016 pushed to February 3, 2017, and the title of the film was changed to Renegades. In January 2017, the film was pushed back again to September 1, 2017. In July, the film was moved from September 1, 2017 to an undetermined release date. Lionsgate Home Entertainment released the film on Blu-ray and DVD on January 22, 2019 under the title American Renegades.

Reception

Box office
Renegades has grossed $2.2 million worldwide against a production budget of $77.5 million.

Critical response
On review aggregator website Rotten Tomatoes, the film holds a 11% rating based on 18 reviews, with an average rating of 4.17/10.

Renegades was panned by critics for its far-fetched narrative, script, lack of action and "gung-ho" themes. Several critics compared the film unfavourably to the 1980s action television series The A-Team. However, the performance of J.K. Simmons was praised.

See also
 List of films featuring the United States Navy SEALs

References

External links
 
 
 

2017 films
2017 action thriller films
American war adventure films
American war films
American action thriller films
French war adventure films
French war films
French action thriller films
French action adventure films
Films set in 1944
Films set in 1995
Films set in Bosnia and Herzegovina
Films set in Serbia
Films about United States Navy SEALs
2010s action adventure films
EuropaCorp films
Babelsberg Studio films
Films directed by Steven Quale
Films produced by Luc Besson
Films with screenplays by Richard Wenk
English-language French films
English-language German films
German action adventure films
German action thriller films
2010s English-language films
2010s American films
2010s French films
2010s German films